Vinzelles may refer to:

Vinzelles, Puy-de-Dôme, a commune in the French region of Auvergne
Vinzelles, Saône-et-Loire, a commune in the French region of Bourgogne